Fred Solovi (born 9 March 1966) is a Samoan wrestler. He competed in the men's freestyle 100 kg at the 1988 Summer Olympics.

References

External links
 

1966 births
Living people
Samoan male sport wrestlers
Olympic wrestlers of Samoa
Wrestlers at the 1988 Summer Olympics
Place of birth missing (living people)